Trident is a brand of sugar-free chewing gum. It was originally introduced by American Chicle shortly before it was bought by Warner-Lambert in 1962, but did not reach the UK until 2007 when it was introduced by its then-owner Cadbury Schweppes in the United Kingdom. In many other European countries, Trident is branded as Stimorol gum; it is generally the same as Trident.

Background
When artificial sweeteners became widespread in the early 1960s, the formula was changed to use saccharin instead of sugar, and Sugar-Free Trident was introduced in 1964 with the slogan "The Great Taste that Is Good for Your Teeth." American Chicle's marketing was one of the first national campaigns to promote dental health through chewing gum.

Trident was manufactured by the American Chicle subsidiary of Warner-Lambert until 1997, when American Chicle became Adams. In 2000, Warner-Lambert was sold to Pfizer and in 2003, Pfizer sold the candy unit (Adams) to Cadbury Schweppes (later Cadbury after selling off the beverages brand in 2007), where the unit became Cadbury Adams. In 2010, Kraft Foods acquired Cadbury, and today, Trident is owned by Mondelez International, the successor to Kraft Foods after it spun off its non-snack foods business as Kraft Foods Group.

For years, Trident was promoted with the slogan, “Four out of five dentists surveyed recommend sugarless gum for their patients who chew gum.” This slogan is believed to have been based on the results of a survey of practicing dentists with either D.D.S. or D.M.D. degrees, apparently conducted in the early 1960s, whose patients included frequent users of chewing gums; the percentage of respondents to the survey whose responses indicated they would make such references to their patients is believed to have been approximately 80%, rounded off to the nearest full percentage point, of the total number of respondents. It became strongly associated with the Trident brand. As of the middle of June 2014, however, Kraft Foods's Cadbury Adams group, whose parent company, Mondelēz International, had become owners of the Trident copyright and patents, was not known to have made any public disclosures of any details about the survey, presumably citing the proprietary nature of the survey data and conclusions as its rationale.

In the early 2000s, "See what Unfolds" became the new slogan for the brand.

Trident gum contains the sugar alcohol xylitol, which is known as a "tooth-friendly" sugar. Use of the chemical has been subject to controversy, as it is highly toxic to dogs.

Products

Original 
Trident Original is the first variant of the Trident product. The gum is contained in packs of 3 or 14 wrapped sticks, and comes in flavors such as spearmint, cinnamon, and strawberry.

Vibes 

Trident Vibes is a version of the gum created in 2018. Each unit contains 40 unwrapped cube-like pieces. This version of the gum comes in flavors such as "Sour Berry Twist", "Tropical Beat", "Spearmint Rush", and the Sour Patch Kids flavors of Redberry, Blue Raspberry, and Watermelon.

Unlike ordinary Trident products, Trident Vibes do not contain statements from the American Dental Association on their packaging. In addition, they contain citric acid, which is known to contribute to tooth demineralization.

See also
Dentyne

References

External links
 Mondelēz International official site
 Trident's official website
 Trident fact sheet

Cadbury Adams brands
Products introduced in 1960
Chewing gum
Mondelez International brands